This article details the fixtures and results of the Taiwan national football team. They played their first match in 1954.

2020s

2010s

2000s

2009

2008

2007

2006

2005

2004

2003

2002

2001

2000

1990s

1997

1980s

1970s

1960s

1950s

Notes

References

External links 
 
 

Results